The list of all various military uniforms by used of the Philippine Commonwealth Army during the Second World War.

Army and military service uniforms

Military headgear 

Military cap
  Peaked cap (1935-1946) 
  Garrison Cap (1935-1946)
  Overseas Cap (1935-1946)

Military coats/jackets/shirts

Military trousers

Military footwear

Army and military combat uniforms

Military Headgear 

Military Helmets
   Brodie helmet (in US M1917 Helmet) (1935-1946) 
  M1 Helmet (1942-1946)
  American M1938 Tanker Helmet (1942-1946)

Military Lightweight Cloth-Covered Helmet
  Guinit Sun Helmets (1935-1942) 
  Sun Helmet (1935-1946)

Military Garrison Caps 
  Garrison Cap (1935-1946) 
  Overseas Cap (1935-1946)

Military Caps, Hats and Hood 
  M1941 American Field Cap (1942-1946)
  American HBT Cap (1942-1946)
  American Tanker Hood (1942-1946)
  American Jeep Cap (1942-1946) 
  M1940 Blue Denim Work Hat (1940-1942)

Military Coats/Jackets/Shirts 

Military Coat
  M1940 Blue Denim Work Coat (1935-1942)

Military Jackets 
  M1940 Blue Denim Work Uniform/Jacket (1940-1942)
  U.S. Army M-1943 Uniform/Jacket (1943-1946) 
  M-1938 Field Jacket (1938-1946) 
  M-1941 Field Jacket (1941-1946) 
  American Tanker Jacket (1942-1946) 
  American HBT Jacket (1942-1946)

Military Shirts
  American Khaki Cotton Summer Uniform/Shirt (1935-1942)
  British Khaki Drill uniform/shirt (1935-1942) 
  American Mustard Wool Uniform/Shirt (1942-1946) 
  American M-1937 Wool Shirt (1942-1946) 
  American M-1937 OD Wool Shirt (1942-1946)

Military Trousers/Shorts

Military Trousers 
  American Khaki Cotton Summer Uniform/Trousers (1935-1942) 
  M1940 Blue Denim Work Uniform/Trousers (1935-1942)
  American Mustard Wool Uniform/Trousers (1942-1946) 
  U.S. Army M-1943 Uniform/Trousers (1943-1946)
  American M-1937 Woolen Trousers (1942-1946) 
  American M-1937 OD Wool Trousers (1942-1946) 
  American HBT Trousers (1942-1946)

Military Shorts 
  British Khaki Drill Uniform/Shorts (1935-1942)

Military Tanker Overalls and Trousers 

Military Overalls 
  American HBT Overalls (1942-1946)

Military Tanker Trousers
  American Tanker Trousers (1935-1946)

Military Footwear 

Military Leggings 
  M-1938 Leggings (1938-1946)

Military Shoes 
  Type 1 Service Shoe (1935-1946) 
  Type 2 Service Shoe (1935-1946)

Military Boots
  American Two Buckle Boots (1942-1946)
  M-1944 Combat Boot (1944-1946)

References 

Philippine Army
Military equipment of the Philippines
Military uniforms